Two human polls made up the 2008–09 NCAA Division I men's basketball rankings, the AP Poll and the Coaches Poll, in addition to various publications' preseason polls.

Legend

AP poll
The Associated Press (AP) preseason poll was released on October 31, 2008.  This poll is compiled by sportswriters across the nation.  In Division I men's and women's college basketball, the AP Poll is largely just a tool to compare schools throughout the season and spark debate, as it has no bearing on postseason play. Generally, all top 25 teams in the poll are invited to the NCAA basketball tournament, also known as March Madness.

ESPN/USA Today Coaches Poll
The Coaches Poll is the second oldest poll still in use after the AP Poll. It is compiled by a rotating group of 31 college Division I head coaches. The Poll operates by Borda count. Each voting member ranks teams from 1 to 25. Each team then receives points for their ranking in reverse order: Number 1 earns 25 points, number 2 earns 24 points, and so forth. The points are then combined and the team with the highest points is then ranked #1; second highest is ranked #2 and so forth. Only the top 25 teams with points are ranked, with teams receiving first-place votes noted in the quantity next to their name. Any team receiving votes after the top 25 is listed after the top 25 by their point totals. However, these are not real rankings: They are not considered #26, #27, etc. The maximum number of points a single team can earn is 775. The preseason poll was released on October 30, 2008.

References

College men's basketball rankings in the United States